Ain't it Dead Yet? is a recording of Canadian electronic group Skinny Puppy's performance at the Toronto Concert Hall on May 31, 1987, during their Cleanse Fold and Manipulate Tour. It was released as an album in 1989. The film was showcased at the South by Southwest festival on March 18, 1989.

Track listing

Notes 
All artwork by Steven R. Gilmore.

Some pressings incorrectly list "One Time One Place" as "God's Gift Maggot". All copies of the CD version incorrectly list "Draining Faces" as "Brap".

Also available on DVD and VHS. The DVDs have been plagued with issues; the first pressings omitted the introduction clip that was on the VHS release. Some later pressings have serious issues with balance and bass.

Some CD pressings present the recording as a single track.

Recorded by Ric Arboit, mixed by Dave Ogilvie.

Personnel 

 Ogre – vocals, theatrics
 Dwayne Goettel – synthesizers, electronic drums
 cEvin Key – drums, synthesizers, electric guitar

References

External links 
 Ain't It Dead Yet? at Discogs (Cassette, Nettwerk)
 Ain't It Dead Yet? at Discogs (Cd, Nettwerk)
 Ain't It Dead Yet? at Discogs (Cd, Nettwerk America)

Skinny Puppy video albums
1989 video albums
Live video albums
1989 live albums
Skinny Puppy live albums
Nettwerk Records live albums
Nettwerk Records video albums
1987 in Canadian music